Sir Armine Wodehouse, 5th Baronet (c. 1714 – 21 May 1777), was a British Tory Member of Parliament.

Wodehouse was the son of Sir John Wodehouse, 4th Baronet, and Mary Fermor. His unusual first name reflects his connection with the Armine Baronets through his grandmother Anne Armine. He was elected to the House of Commons for Norfolk in 1737, a seat he held until 1768. In 1754 he succeeded his father in the baronetcy and to the family seat of Kimberley Hall in Norfolk.

Wodehouse married Letitia Bacon, daughter of Sir Edmund Bacon, 6th Baronet, in 1738. He died in 1777 and was succeeded in the baronetcy by his eldest son John, who was created Baron Wodehouse in 1797 and who was the great-grandfather of statesman John Wodehouse, 1st Earl of Kimberley. Wodehouse's second son Reverend Philip Wodehouse (1745–1811) was the great-grandfather of the author P. G. Wodehouse while his third son Thomas Wodehouse was the grandfather of the colonial administrator Sir Philip Wodehouse.

References
Kidd, Charles, Williamson, David (editors). Debrett's Peerage and Baronetage (1990 edition). New York: St Martin's Press, 1990.

www.thepeerage.com
WODEHOUSE, Armine on The History of Parliament

1777 deaths
Baronets in the Baronetage of England
Members of the Parliament of Great Britain for Norfolk
British MPs 1734–1741
British MPs 1741–1747
British MPs 1747–1754
British MPs 1754–1761
British MPs 1761–1768
Year of birth uncertain
Armine Wodehouse, 5th Baronet